Burtersett is a small village in the Yorkshire Dales, North Yorkshire, England. The village is known for its former quarrying industry and being the seat of the Hillary family, with one strand of the family emigrating to New Zealand and raising Sir Edmund Hillary, the famous mountaineer.

History
Whilst the village is not mentioned in the Domesday Book, its name is recorded as far back as 1280 as Beutresate. The village has also been called Birtresatte and Butterside, with the derivation being Shieling near the alder tree. It was known that the area surrounding Burtersett was a Royal Forest during the reign of Edward I, but gradually the local industry gave way to sheep farming, then later quarrying and dairy produce.

Other industries included knitted products and a candles. The candle factory, a four-story building, still exists today, but the operation is believed to have stopped in the early 20th century.

Quarrying on the moor south of the village reached a peak in 1890, when two stone slate quarries were in operation; Burtersett and Seavy. Although the men referred to themselves as quarrymen, both sites were actually mines which operated  gauge tramways to transport the stone into the village. The stone was called slate, but it was a sandstone, typically used as a flagstone, but thicker beds were used as a building stone in the area.

Hillary Hall
The late 17th/early 18th grade II listed building known as Hillary Hall was formerly the seat of Sir Henry Hillary, a landowner in Upper Wensleydale. The house was the birthplace of many in the Hillary family, including Sir Henry (1697–1763), who was known for his work on tropical diseases. His nephew, Sir William Hillary, who campaigned for the institution of the RNLI, was born in the village. The grandparents of the mountaineer Sir Edmund Hillary emigrated from Wensleydale to New Zealand in the 19th century.

Governance
Historically, Burtersett was in the Parish of Aysgarth and the wapentake of Hang West. Whilst it now belongs in the civil parish of Hawes which it is nearer, Aysgarth was the largest settlement around until the Richmond to Lancaster Turnpike was diverted off Cam High Road (south of Burtersett) to go through Hawes and over Widdale.

References

External links

Map of the village

Villages in North Yorkshire
Hawes